Adia is a genus of flies in the family Anthomyiidae.

Species
A. aharonii (Hennig, 1976)
A. cinerella (Fallén, 1825)
A. grisella (Rondani, 1871)
A. latifrons (Ackland, 1971)

References

Anthomyiidae
Muscoidea genera
Taxa named by Jean-Baptiste Robineau-Desvoidy